The first season of the Pakistani music television series Coke Studio commenced airing on 6 February 2008 and ended on 18 April 2008.

The show was produced by The Coca-Cola Company and Rohail Hyatt. The production team included Rohail Hyatt as the executive producer along with Umber Hyatt and Nofil Naqvi being the producers of the show. Natasha De Souza and Naseer-ud-din Wasif served as production team members.

Artists
Artists featured in the show included, Rahat Fateh Ali Khan, Ali Azmat, Ali Zafar, Ustaad H. B Gullo, Saieen Tufail Ahmed, Ahsan Farooq, Strings, Sajid & Zeeshan, Saba & Selina and Mauj.

Featured Artists 

Ali Azmat
Ali Zafar
Mauj
Ustad Hussain Baksh Gullo
Rahat Fateh Ali Khan
Sain Tufail
Sajid & Zeeshan
Strings
The show also featured a house band which had some of the high-profile musicians in the country including, Omran Shafique on guitars, Kamran Zafar on bass guitars, Zeeshan Parwez on keyboards and turntables, Louis 'Gumby' Pinto on drums. Other members of the house band included, Saba Shabbir, Athar Sani and Selina Rashid on backing vocals along with Babar Khanna, Zulfiq 'Shazee' Ahmed Khan and The Abdul Latif Band on percussions.

Backing Vocals 

Saba Shabbir 
Selina Rashid

House Band 

Bass: Kamran "Mannu" Zafar
Coordinator & Flute: Rahat Ali
DJ and Synthesizers: Zeeshan Parvez
Drums: Louis "Gumby" Pinto
Guitars: Omran "Momo" Shafique
Percussion: The Abdul Latif Band, Babar Khanna & Shaizi

Episodes 
The first episode aired on 8 June, followed by the second episode being aired on 29 June. The third episode was aired on all locals channels on 20 July and the show came to an end on 4 August, which also rebroadcast three songs, "Sar Kiye" by Strings, "Garaj Baras" by Ali Azmat featuring Rahat Fateh Ali Khan and "Allah Hu" by Tufail Ahmed and Ali Zafar, from the previous episodes.

List of Songs

Notes

References

External links
 

Season01
2008 Pakistani television seasons